Crescat Boulevard also popularly known as Crescat is a Sri Lankan shopping mall which is located in Western Province, Kollupitiya, Colombo near the St. Thomas' Preparatory School and Crescat Residencies adjoining the Cinnamon Grand Colombo. It is a two-storeyed shopping mall consisting of three floors and it is one of the most popular shopping malls in Colombo.

The shopping mall consists of bookstores, boutiques, designer shops, a food court, cafes and a supermarket. The basement floor is split between a food court and a large supermarket. The second floor consists of a cafe, a bookshop, body shops and clothing retail stores. The third floor consists of a cafe, fashion shops, perfumes and accessories shops.

See also 
 Lotus Tower

References 

Buildings and structures in Colombo
Shopping malls in Sri Lanka
Tourist attractions in Colombo